SpaceX CRS-9, also known as SpX-9, is a Commercial Resupply Service mission to the International Space Station which launched on 18 July 2016.  The mission was contracted by NASA and is operated by SpaceX using a Dragon capsule.

The cargo was successfully carried aboard SpaceX's Falcon 9 Flight 27.

Launch and operations history
A July 2014 NASA Flight Planning Integration Panel (FPIP) presentation had this mission scheduled no earlier than (NET) 7 December 2015. By December 2014, the launch had been pushed back to NET 9 December 2015. Following the failure of SpaceX CRS-7 on 28 June 2015, the launch date was left open and, in September 2015, was moved to NET 21 March 2016. The flight was later pushed to 24 June, 27 June, 16 July, and finally 18 July 2016, as the crewed mission Soyuz MS-01 took the 24 June slot.

CRS-9 launched on 18 July 2016 at 04:44 UTC from Cape Canaveral SLC-40 aboard a Falcon 9 launch vehicle. After 9 minutes and 37 seconds the Dragon spacecraft successfully separated from the rocket, and deployed its solar arrays about two minutes later. The opening of its GNC door came two hours later, enabling orbital operations.

After a series or orbital maneuvers and stationkeeping at different hold points, the CRS-9 Dragon was captured by the ISS's Canadarm2 on 20 July 2016 at 10:56 UTC. After robotic operations, it was berthed some three hours later at 14:03 UTC.

Dragon was released from Canadarm2 the following day at 10:11 UTC.

Primary payload
NASA contracted for the CRS-9 mission from SpaceX and therefore determined the primary payload, date/time of launch, and orbital parameters for the Dragon space capsule.

CRS-9 carried  of cargo to the International Space Station. Its unpressurized cargo, the International Docking Adapter-2 located in Dragon's trunk, massed .

Some of the key experiments transported by CRS-9 to the ISS were the Biomolecule Sequencer, which performed DNA sequencing in orbit; the Phase Change Heat Exchanger, which tested temperature regulation systems for future spacecraft applications; the OsteoOmics experiment, which tested if Earth-based magnetic levitation can properly simulate microgravity conditions; and the Heart Cells experiment from Stanford University, which examined the effects of microgravity on the human heart at the cellular and molecular level using human induced pluripotent stem cell-derived cardiomyocytes.

First stage landing

Following stage separation, the rocket's first stage performed a boostback maneuver and landed smoothly at Landing Zone 1, Cape Canaveral, for the second time on solid ground, following Falcon 9 Flight 20 in December 2015.

See also
 List of Falcon 9 launches

References

External links
 
 SpaceX CRS portal at NASA.gov
 Dragon spacecraft page at SpaceX.com

SpaceX Dragon
Spacecraft launched in 2016
Spacecraft which reentered in 2016
SpaceX payloads contracted by NASA
Supply vehicles for the International Space Station